Novopetrovskoye is a rural locality (a selo) in Ufimsky Selsoviet, Khaybullinsky District, Bashkortostan, Russia. The population was 302 as of 2010.

Geography 
It is located 34 km from Akyar.

References 

Rural localities in Khaybullinsky District